Anna David may refer to:
Anna David (singer) (born 1984), Danish pop and soul music singer
Anna David (journalist) (born 1970), American journalist